Nikolaos G. Michaloliakos (born 11 December 1957) is a Greek politician and convicted criminal. He is the founder and leader of the far-right party Golden Dawn. In October 2020, he and 67 other Golden Dawn leaders were found guilty of leading a criminal organisation by the Athens Appeals Court.

Early life and education

Michaloliakos was born in Athens in 1957. According to his party, he completed his studies at the Faculty of Mathematics of the National and Kapodistrian University of Athens.

Political involvements
At the age of 16, he joined the nationalist 4th of August Party of Konstantinos Plevris. He also participated in the Athens local organisation of EOKA-B. He was arrested for the first time in July 1974, during a protest outside the British embassy in Athens, against the stance of the United Kingdom toward the Turkish invasion of Cyprus. He was arrested again for assaulting journalists covering the December 1976 funeral of Evangelos Mallios, a policeman who tortured people during the Regime of the Colonels, assassinated by the terrorist group 17N, but was released. While he was in prison, Michaloliakos met the leaders of the Greek military junta of 1967–1974. After that he joined the Hellenic Army and became a commander of the Fast Attack Craft Command. He was arrested again in July 1978 and sentenced to one year imprisonment in January 1979 for illegally carrying guns and explosives. He was also dismissed from his position in the army.

After he was released, he launched the Golden Dawn magazine. The politics of the magazine were, initially, closely aligned with Nazi beliefs. The publication of the magazine ceased in April 1984, when Michaloliakos joined the National Political Union, and took over the leadership of its youth section, after a personal order of Georgios Papadopoulos. In January 1985, he broke away from the National Political Union and founded the "Popular National Movement - Golden Dawn".

Michaloliakos remained the leader of Golden Dawn until he announced its disbandment in November 2005. He took this step due to clashes with anti-fascists. In 2005–2007, he (like most members of Golden Dawn) continued his political activity through the Patriotic Alliance. The party was reformed under his leadership in 2007.

Golden Dawn as a political party drew public attention in the 1990s and early 2000. In May 2012, under Michaloliakos' leadership, it garnered 21 seats in Parliament during an election conducted amid Greece's severe financial crisis, and was embroiled in various controversies, attracting international attention. A particularly controversial point was Michaloliakos's denial of the existence of the gas chambers, which the Nazis used to murder Jews, homosexuals, and other persons during World War II.

Arrest

Following the fatal stabbing of Pavlos Fyssas on 17 September 2013 by a supporter of his party, Michaloliakos was arrested in a 28 September 2013 sweep, along with numerous other Golden Dawn leaders on the charges of being involved in a criminal organisation. The charge sheet included murder, extortion, and involvement in the disappearance of up to 100 immigrants. After 18 months of pretrial detention, the maximum allowed, Michaloliakos was released from jail and placed under house arrest. On 29 July 2015, his house arrest was lifted, but he was prohibited from leaving the Attica region.

In April 2015, the trial of Michaloliakos and 68 other defendants began at the high-security Korydallos prison in Athens, but was adjourned a number of times for technical reasons and to find a more suitable setting. Michaloliakos was one of 68 Golden Dawn leaders who were found guilty in October 2020.

Personal life

He is the husband of fellow Golden Dawn member Eleni Zaroulia. His daughter Ourania was one of six people arrested during a motorcycle attack against immigrants; all six were later released.

In a televised interview, Michaloliakos publicly insulted Milwaukee Bucks forward and 2019 and 2020 NBA Most Valuable Player Giannis Antetokounmpo after he was selected as the 15th overall pick in the 2013 NBA draft, calling him a "chimpanzee". He even publicly stated that Antetokounmpo and his family should have been detained and deported immediately after their meeting with then-Prime Minister Antonis Samaras.

Publications 

Enemies of the Regime (Εχθροί του Καθεστώτος), 2000
Against All (Εναντίον Όλων), 2001
The Last Loyals (Οι Τελευταίοι Πιστοί), 2002
For a Greater Greece in a Free Europe (Για μια Μεγάλη Ελλάδα σε μια Ελεύθερη Ευρώπη), 2000
Pericles Giannopoulos: The Apollonian Speech (Περικλής Γιαννόπουλος: Ο Απολλώνιος Λόγος), 2006
The Confession of a Heathen (Η Εξομολόγηση ενός Εθνικού), reprinted in 2008
From the Ashes of Berlin to Globalisation (Από τις Στάχτες του Βερολίνου στην Παγκοσμιοποίηση), 2008
Defending National Memory (Υπερασπίζοντας την Εθνική Μνήμη), 2009

References

External links

 

1957 births
National and Kapodistrian University of Athens alumni
Writers from Athens
Greek fascists
Greek anti-communists
Greek Holocaust deniers
Living people
Politicians from Athens
Greek neo-Nazis
Greek MPs 2012 (May)
Greek MPs 2012–2014
Golden Dawn (political party) politicians
Greek MPs 2015 (February–August)
Greek MPs 2015–2019
Hellenic Army officers